Helvi is a Finnish given name for females.

People
Helvi Juvonen (1919–1959), Finnish writer
Helvi Hämäläinen (1901–1998), Finnish author
Helvi Leiviskä (1902—1982), Finnish composer, writer, music educator and librarian
Helvi Mustonen (b. 1947), Finnish artist
Helvi Poutasuo (1943–2017), Finnish teacher, translator, editor, politician
Helvi Sipilä (1915-2009), Finnish diplomat

Ships
 a Finnish cargo ship

Finnish feminine given names